Philip Hartman (May 16, 1915 – August 28, 2015) was an American mathematician at Johns Hopkins University working on differential equations who introduced the Hartman–Grobman theorem. He served as Chairman of the Mathematics Department at Johns Hopkins for several years. He has an Erdös number of 2.

His book gives a necessary and sufficient condition for solutions of ordinary initial value problems to be unique and to depend on a class C1 manner on the initial conditions for solutions.

He died in August 2015 at the age of 100.

Publications

References

External links 

1915 births
2015 deaths
People from Baltimore
20th-century American mathematicians
American centenarians
Men centenarians
Johns Hopkins University alumni
Johns Hopkins University faculty
Dynamical systems theorists
Mathematical analysts